A Matter of Interpretation is a 2014 South Korean comedy drama film, written and directed by Lee Kwang-kuk.

Plot
Yeon-sin (Shin Dong-mi) is devastated and storms out of the theatre when no one shows up at her play. She calls her boyfriend Woo-yeon (Kim Kang-hyun) and in a fit of anger breaks up with him. She then meets an unorthodox detective (Yoo Jun-sang) with a gift for interpreting dreams.

Cast
 Shin Dong-mi as Yeon-sin
 Yoo Jun-sang as Detective
 Kim Kang-hyun as Woo-yeon
 Lee David as ticket's agent
 Lee Bong-ryun as Landlady

Awards and nominations

References

External links
 
 
 

2014 films
South Korean comedy-drama films
2010s Korean-language films
Films directed by Lee Kwang-kuk
2010s South Korean films